Sir Gilbert Elliot, 1st Baronet, of Minto ( – 1 May 1718) was a Scottish writer, lawyer, politician and judge from Minto in the Scottish Borders.

He was the younger son of Gavin Elliot of Midlem Mill, Roxburghshire, and his wife, Margaret Hay. He was educated at the University of Edinburgh.

Initially a writer, he began assisting in legal cases, helping William Veitch escape execution in 1679 as an opponent of King Charles II. After similarly helping the Earl of Argyll in 1681, Elliot went into exile in Europe in 1685, and in his absence was sentenced to death and forfeiture. He was pardoned by King James VII and returned to Scotland in 1687, where he was admitted to the Faculty of Advocates in 1688.

After the Glorious Revolution, the forfeiture was quashed in 1690. Elliot became a clerk to the Privy Council of Scotland, was knighted in 1692, and made a baronet, of Minto, in 1700.

He sat in the Parliament of Scotland for Roxburghshire from 1703 until the Parliament of Scotland and the Parliament of England were combined to form the Parliament of Great Britain in 1707, which he opposed.  In 1703 he became a judge of the Court of Session, taking the judicial title of Lord Minto.

Elliot died at the age of 67 on 1 May 1718, and was succeeded in the baronetcy by his son Gilbert.

References 
 

1650 births
Year of birth uncertain
1718 deaths
People from the Scottish Borders
Shire Commissioners to the Parliament of Scotland
Baronets in the Baronetage of Nova Scotia
Senators of the College of Justice
People sentenced to death in absentia
Recipients of Scottish royal pardons
Members of the Parliament of Scotland 1702–1707
Alumni of the University of Edinburgh
Members of the Faculty of Advocates
Scottish writers